Yousuf Hussain Abadi()  is known as a historian, Balti writer, translator of the Quran, linguist, scholar and a social worker and the pioneer in field of research in Skardu, Baltistan region of Gilgit Baltistan, Pakistan. Yousuf Hussain Abadi translated Quran in Balti language in first time. He is also running a Museum  of Balti traditional items and a chain of school network in his area as well.

Yousuf Hussain Abadi collected many oral war stories of 1947-1948 war which was fought in Baltistan by its natives against Dogra'a regime. He established the first private sector English medium school in Baltistan in 1992-93, Jinnah Public School, named after the great founder of Pakistan, Mohammad Ali Jinnah, which is currently one of the best institutions of education in Baltistan.

References 

Balti people
Pakistani writers
People from Skardu District
Pakistani Muslims
Quran translators